This is a list of Gujarati language films that are scheduled to release in 2018.

January–March

April–June

July–September

October–December

References

External links
 List of Gujarati films of 2018 at the Internet Movie Database

2017
Gujarati
Gujarati